Elaine Aylward is a camogie player and a bank official, winner of a camogie All Star award in 2009. She played in the 2009 All Ireland camogie final.

Career
Described in the programme notes for the 2009 All Ireland final as "a defender whose forceful runs paid big dividends" in the 2009 All Ireland semi-final, Elaine won a Junior All-Ireland in 2002 and added a National League medal in 2008. She won a Gael Linn Cup medal with Leinster as well as three provincial Senior titles. Her senior debut was in 2002.

References

External links 
 Official Camogie Website
 Kilkenny Camogie Website
 Review of 2009 championship in On The Ball Official Camogie Magazine
 https://web.archive.org/web/20091228032101/http://www.rte.ie/sport/gaa/championship/gaa_fixtures_camogie_oduffycup.html Fixtures and results] for the 2009 O'Duffy Cup
 All-Ireland Senior Camogie Championship: Roll of Honour
 Video highlights of 2009 championship Part One and part two
 Video Highlights of 2009 All Ireland Senior Final
 Report of All Ireland final in Irish Times Independent and Examiner

1985 births
Living people
Kilkenny camogie players